Donald Rae Yeagley (May 6, 1920 – May 16, 2020) was an American politician and labor union activist.

Yeagley was born in La Paz, Indiana and graduated from Lakeville High School in 1937. He worked at a tool and die maker at Bendix Aviation Corporation. Yeagley was involved with the labor union movement and the United Automobile Workers. Yeagley served in the Indiana House of Representatives from 1959 to 1963 and was a Democrat. He then served in the Indiana Senate from 1963 to 1965. Yeagley died at the Tanglewood Trace Senior Living Community in Mishawaka, Indiana.

Notes

1920 births
2020 deaths
People from Marshall County, Indiana
American centenarians
Men centenarians
Machinists
United Auto Workers people
Democratic Party members of the Indiana House of Representatives
Democratic Party Indiana state senators
Bendix Corporation people